Silent News was the premier national newspaper for the deaf. Founded by Julius Wiggins (1928-2001), Silent News was published from January 1969 until 2003.

Wiggins and his family moved from Toronto, Ontario, Canada to a home in Fair Lawn, New Jersey, where they began development of a newspaper for the deaf that was launched in January 1969.

See also
The Silent Worker

References

External links

Deaf culture in the United States
Defunct newspapers published in New Jersey
Defunct newspapers published in New York (state)
Publications established in 1969
Publications disestablished in 2003